"Oklahoma Hills" is a song written by Woody Guthrie. In 2001 it was named the official Folk Song of the state of Oklahoma.

Chorus
Way down yonder in the Indian nation
I rode my pony on the reservation
In the Oklahoma Hills where I was born
Way down yonder in the Indian nation
A cowboy’s life is my occupation
In the Oklahoma Hills where I was born

Jack Guthrie Recording
Jack Guthrie, Woody's cousin, changed the lyrics and music slightly and in 1945 recorded a Western swing version, which reached Number 1 on the Juke Box Folk Records charts. It remains the best-known version of "Oklahoma Hills", and was the biggest hit of Jack Guthrie's fairly short life. Though Woody originated the song, the official Woody Guthrie website credits both him and Jack as its writers, perhaps because Jack's changes have become so well known.

Recordings
Recordings of "Oklahoma Hills" have been made by these singers, among others:
Chet Atkins
Floyd Cramer
Gene Autry
Moe Bandy
Johnny Bond
Tommy Collins
The Dinning Sisters
Charlie Feathers
Arlo Guthrie, Woody's son,recorded the song for his album Running Down the Road, released in 1969 by Warner Bros. Records.
Jimmy Lafave
Mary McCaslin
Country Joe McDonald

 John Mellencamp

Michael J. Miles
Michael Parks
Marvin Rainwater
Jim Reeves
The Reno Brothers
Carl Smith
Bruce Springsteen
Kay Starr
James Talley
Country singer Hank Thompson, joined by His Brazos Valley Boys, recorded a well-known version of "Oklahoma Hills" in 1961. Thompson's Western swing rendition reached No. 10 on the Billboard magazine Hot C&W Singles chart.
Ernest Tubb
T. Texas Tyler
Ian Tyson
Jimmy Wakely
Bob Wills and His Texas Playboys
Ramblin' Jack Elliott
David Carradine, in the 1976 Bound for Glory movie and in its soundtrack album, Academy Award winner for Best Original Song Score and Its Adaptation or Adaptation Score.

Accolades
Members of the Western Writers of America chose it as one of the Top 100 Western songs of all time. In 2001, the Oklahoma Legislature declared it to be the official state folk song.

References

External links
Lyrics at woodyguthrie.org.
Oklahoma Session Laws—Section 47 - Oklahoma State Folk Song; declaring "Oklahoma Hills" as the Oklahoma State Folk Song.

 
 

1945 songs
Woody Guthrie songs
Hank Thompson (musician) songs
Western swing songs
United States state songs
Symbols of Oklahoma
Songs written by Woody Guthrie
Music of Oklahoma
Anthems of non-sovereign states
Songs about Oklahoma